Mount Zion Covered Bridge was a  long Burr truss covered bridge near Mooresville, Kentucky. It was built in 1871 and burned down in 2021. For 150 years it spanned the Little Beech Fork north of Mooresville on Kentucky Route 458. 

The bridge had been closed to vehicular traffic when a new bridge was constructed beside it, but it remained a tourist attraction as the longest multi-span covered bridge in Kentucky.

Beech Fork, Mooresville, and Mount Zion were all accepted names for the bridge. Mount Zion appears to be the most used historic name. It was listed on the National Register of Historic Places in 1976. Records from 1871 indicate it to be 280 feet long and 18 feet wide, but a measurement taken by Kentucky's Department of Transportation in the 1970s measured it at 211 feet.

During a 2015-2017 restoration of the bridge it was determined by the contractor, Arnold M. Graton Associates of Ashland, New Hampshire, that the arches were a very early modification to the bridge. As such, the bridge was reclassified as a Multiple Kingpost Truss with added arches.

It burned down on March 9, 2021; suspected arson.

Gallery

References

Bibliography
Alien, Richard S. Covered Bridges of the South. New York: Bonanza Books, 1970.
Kentucky Covered Bridge Association. Timbered Tunnel Talk. Newport, Kentucky (various issues).

External links
 BridgeHunter.com

National Register of Historic Places in Washington County, Kentucky
Bridges completed in 1871
Covered bridges in the United States destroyed by arson
Covered bridges on the National Register of Historic Places in Kentucky
Transportation in Washington County, Kentucky
King post truss bridges in the United States
Demolished but still listed on the National Register of Historic Places
2021 disestablishments in Kentucky
Buildings and structures destroyed by arson
Former buildings and structures in Kentucky